Aamby Valley City is a township developed by the Sahara India Pariwar on the outskirts of Pune, India.

Construction and connectivity
The township is connected by road from Mahabaleshwar. The township has an airstrip that stopped functioning in late 2016.

Marketed to India's super-rich, the city was developed in five phases. It was designed and master planned by GruenBobby Mukherji & Associates in the year 2003. It is almost entirely owned and operated by Sahara and related entities. It has between 600800 luxury bungalows priced between 5 crore to 20 crore.

Three large man made lakes have been created by constructing dams. The largest lake is 1.5 km in length. The city is spread over 10,000 acres and ten villages near Lonavala and boasts of an airstrip, helipads, shopping complexes, 256 acres PGA approved 18-hole golf course, captive power plant, two small dams, an international school, and a hospital. The township has multiple luxury restaurants and a lagoon with an artificial beach adjacent to the replica of Varanasi ghat for cultural programs.

In late 2016, the golf course and the airstrip stopped functioning.

Financial troubles
Since its founding the city has faced variety of financial and legal troubles for having received investments of 62,643 crore from deposits collected by four Sahara cooperative societies allegedly in violation of norms. Per Sahara group, the Aamby Valley project was valued at about 1 trillion ($14.76 billion) in 2014, citing a Knight Frank India report. This high valuation claimed by Sahara was in contrast with the weakened financial profile of the project. According to Securities and Exchange Board of India, Aamby Valley posted an after-tax profit of 90 million in the 12 months ended March 2013 compared to 694 million in the July 2011-March 2012 period.  In 2018-19, the Aamby Valley project made a consolidated loss of 994 crore compared to a loss of 1,133 crore in the previous year. Its total income came down to 958 crore in 2018-19 from 1,530 crore a year ago.

In 2016, the Tehsildar of Mulshi, a local revenue authority, sealed the gated township for non-payment of taxes. It was reopened the same day after Sahara group made a payment of 2.53 crore.

Sales proceedings
In April 2017, the Supreme Court of India ordered the auction of Aamby Valley project to recoup 14,000 crore the company owes to duped investors. The court set a seemingly high reserve price of 37,000 crore, which led to limited interest and only two bids and no buyers in the end. In July 2018, after failing to attract prospective buyers, the supreme court deferred the auction and allowed to city to be under control of the Sahara Parivar. In 2019, the court decided to continue with the auction.

In January 2020, the supreme court appointed a receiver to manage Aamby Valley and to explore a new auction.

Sponsorship
In 2014, Aamby Valley inked a 4-year $14 million sponsorship deal with Bangladesh national cricket team. Without citing any reasons, the Bangladesh Cricket Board ended the contract 15 months before it was scheduled to end.

See also
 Lavasa
 Sahara India Pariwar investor fraud case

References

External links

 

Cities and towns in Pune district
Lonavala-Khandala